is the second single by Japanese girl group Melon Kinenbi. It was released on March 19, 2008, and its highest position on the Oricon weekly chart was #62. This was the final single Melon Kinenbi released as part of Hello! Project, before their official graduation at the end of March along with the rest of the Elder Club.

Track listing

External links
Charisma - Kirei at the Up-Front Works release list (Japanese)

2008 singles
Zetima Records singles
2008 songs